The Norton 650SS is a   vertical twin motorcycle made by Norton Motorcycle Company from 1962 to 1967. The 650SS was based on the Norton Manxman.

SS stood for Sports Special. Norton discontinued its 600 cc models to concentrate on production of the 650SS, which quickly gained a reputation as the "best of the Dommies".

Development

Norton produced a 650 in 1961 for export only, which was sold in the US as the Manxman. It was finished in polychromatic blue and a bright red seat with white piping and much chrome plate, and a special exhaust system only fitted to the Manxman. Initially production was at Norton's Bracebridge Street, Birmingham factory, but following the factory's closure in 1963, production was transferred to parent company AMC's works in Plumstead, London.

A European styled version of the Manxman was shown in early 1962 at the Amsterdam International Auto Show and went on sale in April that year as the 650SS. The machine had twin Amal Monobloc carburettors with the intakes angled downwards. Twin exhausts replaced the 99SS two-into-one and the headlight nacelle was replaced with a separately mounted speedometer and tachometer. The 650SS was finished with a black frame with silver fuel tank and optional chrome fenders.

This was more than  faster than the rival Triumph Bonneville tested the previous summer.

References

External links

650SS
Sport bikes
Standard motorcycles
Motorcycles powered by straight-twin engines